Live at the Contamination Festival is a live album by Daylight Dies. It was recorded in January 2003 and released by Relapse Records in 2005. Production was limited to 1000 copies.

Track listing

Credits
Guthrie Iddings – harsh vocals
Barre Gambling – guitars
Egan O'Rourke – bass, clean vocals
Jesse Haff – drums

Session musicians 
Robert Daugherty – guitars

Daylight Dies albums
2005 live albums
Relapse Records live albums